Silvia Ruffini (1475 – Rome, 6 December 1561) was a Italian noble woman and mistress of Cardinal Alessandro Farnese before he becomes pope (Pope Paul III from 1534); she was the mother of his four children.

Biography
She was the daughter of Rufino Ruffini and Giulia (her last name is unknown), and they lived in a palace in the Colonna neighborhood. She had four brothers (Giacomo, Girolamo, Ascanio and Mario) and two sisters (Camilla and Ippolita). 

At some time around 1496 she married a Roman merchant Giovanni Battista Crispo, with whom she had three sons: Sallustio, Virgilio and Cardinal Tiberio Crispo. Her husband Crispo died in 1501; she may already have been romantically involved with Cardinal Farnese by then. 

Ruffini was introduced to Alessandro Farnese by his sister Giulia (mistress to Pope Alexander VI), and the Cardinal offered to be her escort through Rome. The first daughter of Ruffini and Alessandro Farnese, Costanza, was probably born already in 1500. Ruffini also had three other children with the Cardinal; some of them may have been born while Ruffini's husband was still alive. The children were Pier Luigi, Paolo and Ranuccio. 

When Alessandro became Bishop of Parma, the church's vicar-general, Bartolomeo Guidiccioni required him to end the relationship with Ruffini. As pope, Paul III kept her identity a secret, fearing the negative publicity that had plagued his sister Giulia. Baldassarre Molosso, poet and guardian of the couple's children, hints that Paul III kept her in the town of Bolsena, a village owned by her son and where Paul III had a villa. The location was also close to Silvia's sister Camilla. 

Ruffini died on Tuesday 5 December 1561 in Rome, aged about 86 years old, and was buried in a family crypt.

Issue 
She had three children by Giovanni Battista Crispo: 

 Tiberio Crispo, who later became a cardinal;
 Sallustio Crispo;

 Virgilio Crispo. 

She had four children by Alessandro Farnese (later Pope Paul III): 

 Costanza Farnese (1500-1545), who married Bosio II Sforza of Santa Fiora, 9th Count of Santa Fiora; 
 Pier Luigi Farnese (1503-1547), Duke of Parma; 
 Paolo Farnese (1504-1512); 
 Ranuccio Farnese (1509-1529).

Portrayals
Ruffini is portrayed by Laura Fedorowycz in the TV series Borgia.

Historian Patrizia Rosini believes Silvia was the model for two portraits: one in the Allegory of Baptism in the Rondanini Palace and the second in the Sala del Perseo in the castle of Sant'Angelo,

References

External links

1561 deaths
Papal family members
1475 births
House of Farnese
Nobility from Rome
Women and the papacy
Papal mistresses